The Higher School of Computer Engineering at UNED (National University of Distance Education) is an institute of higher education in Spain, with an extensive network of collaborating institutions, that teaches and issues degrees in Computer Science Engineering, Computer Systems Engineer and Business Computing Engineering, as well as bachelors, masters and PhDs.

History  
The Higher School of Computer Engineering at UNED was established in 1991. Its creation was the response to a growing demand for computer science professionals with different degrees not only focused in computing but also in industry, business and research. In 2001 the school expanded its academic offering to include master's degrees. In 2010–2011 the academic content was adapted to the requirements of the European Higher Education Program, replacing the former degrees.

Academic offerings currently include the following:

 Computer engineering (five academic courses)
 Computer engineering degree (four academic courses)
 Information and Communication Technologies Engineering – IT Engineering (four academic courses)

School departments

 Computer Science and Languages
 Artificial Intelligence
 Automatics and Computer Science
 Software Engineering and Computer Systems
 Communication Systems and Control

Inter-faculty departments 

 Business Management
 Business Economics and Accounting
 Material Physics
 Statistic, Operative Investigation and Calculus
 Fundamentals Mathematics
 Applied Mathematics I
 Mechanic
 Electric, Electronics and Control Engineering
 Manufacturing Engineering

Research groups 

 Computer Systems and Language Department
 Natural Language Processing (NLP Group)
 Interactive Environments for Teaching-Learning (LTCS Group)

 Artificial Intelligence Department
 Research Center for Decision-making Intelligence Systems (CISIAD)
 aDeNu
 SIEA
 Intelligence Systems: Modelling, Development and Applications (SIMDA)

 Computer Systems and Automatic Department
 Modelling, simulation and process control
 Industrial computing

 Software Engineering and Computer Systems Department
 Software Quality
 Computer Graphics and Virtual Reality
 Software Engineering
 Robotics and Artificial Intelligence
 RFID Middleware

 Communication and Control Systems Department
 Parameter space, multi-frequency and fractional techniques for system control

External links 
 Academic Ranking of World UniversitiesCSIC
 Foreign Collaborative Centers

References

Engineering universities and colleges in Spain
National University of Distance Education